Karla Indira Conga Lomas (born 23 January 1994) is a Peruvian footballer who plays as a full back for La Cantera and the Peru women's national team.

International career
Conga represented Peru at the 2014 South American U-20 Women's Championship. At senior level, she played the 2014 Copa América Femenina.

References

1994 births
Living people
Women's association football fullbacks
Peruvian women's footballers
Peru women's international footballers
Club Alianza Lima footballers